A practical test, more commonly known as a checkride, is the Federal Aviation Administration examination which one must undergo in the United States to receive an aircraft pilot's certification, or a rating for additional flight privileges.  The name refers to the portion of the examination in which the candidate being examined flies in an aircraft with the Designated Pilot Examiner or other authorized examiner to demonstrate competency in the skills that are required for the certification.  Although "checkride" is the most commonly used term, it is considered informal and is technically known as a Practical Test by the FAA and in all its literature, and the specific objectives which the candidate must meet are called the Airman Certification Standards, or ACS. However, some Practical Tests, notably those for helicopter, and balloon ratings, and those for certificates such as flight instructor, and aircraft mechanic, are still conducted using the older Practical Test Standards, or PTS. Other positions that often include checkrides include air traffic controllers and flight dispatchers.

In addition to successfully completing a checkride, one must also complete an oral examination (which happens before, and often, to some extent, during the checkride) and meet certain basic aeronautical experience requirements (such as number of hours flown) as well as pass a separate multiple-choice computer-administered test that is quite consistently called the "written test."

During a checkride, an examiner takes on a role more like that of a passenger rather than an instructor. It is the examiner's job to observe that the candidate demonstrates good decision-making skills, rather than teach or to act as a crewmember, although an examiner is likely to offer advice during the ride if inclined.  The examiner usually does not touch any of the aircraft controls unless necessary to maintain the safety of the flight, in which case the candidate usually fails the examination instantly, except for the part when the examiner acts as a safety pilot during operations with a view limiting device.

While the Airman Certification Standards outline very specific tolerances that a prospect must adhere to, the examiner has a certain amount of subjective control over whether the student passes or fails.

When a candidate fails a checkride, the examiner has the discretion to end the checkride immediately or to allow the student to complete the remaining objectives of the checkride to and defer the failed task to a retake.  The checkride may not continue without the consent of the applicant. During the retake, the examiner is required to test only the previously-failed or uncompleted items but may retest any items previously passed or to fail the candidate again based on them.

If the checkride has to be stopped due to any reason besides student pilot failure, such as weather setting in, the examiner will issue a letter of discontinuance, which will state the maneuvers that have been completed so that the retake checkride can be limited to the maneuvers that have not yet been completed.

References
 Federal Aviation Administration, Airmen Certification Standards
 Federal Aviation Administration, Airmen Practical Test Standards
 Richard Hiner, "Checkride Success", Aircraft Owners and Pilots Association 

Tests
Federal Aviation Administration